The Calderón Hinojosa family is a Mexican political family from the state of Michoacán whose members have included one Mexican President and various notable right-wing politicians.

Notable members 
Luis Calderón Vega, a writer and founder of the National Action Party (PAN).
María del Carmen Hinojosa González, Calderón Vega's wife.
Felipe Calderón Hinojosa, President of Mexico 2006-2012 (PAN), son of Calderón Vega.
Margarita Zavala de Calderón, former PAN deputy, wife of Calderón Hinojosa.
Luisa María Calderón Hinojosa, former PAN senator, daughter of Calderón Vega.
Juan Luis Calderón Hinojosa, public servant in Michoacán, son of Calderón Vega.
Carmen de Fátima Calderón Hinojosa, public servant in Michoacán, daughter of Calderón Vega.

Political families of Mexico